The College of Engineering Chengannur  commonly known as CEC, is an engineering institute in the state of Kerala, India that was established by the Government of Kerala under the aegis of the  Institute of Human Resources Development (IHRD) in 1993. The college is located in Chengannur, Alappuzha. The college  is affiliated to the APJ Abdul Kalam Technological University and the courses are recognised by AICTE and accredited by NBA, the National Board of Accreditation, India.

Location
CEC is situated in the heart of Chengannur, with the M.C. Road linking it to Thiruvananthapuram International Airport (100 km south) and Kochi Airport (100 km north). The Chengannur Railway Station and Bus Station are located within walking distance from the college.

Overview 
The college has been approved by the All India Council for Technical Education, New Delhi .  Being located in Chengannur town, Alleppey district, the college has access to transport, communication, and lodging facilities.  It was one of the five engineering colleges in Kerala selected by the government of India for the Technical Education Quality Improvement Programme (TEQIP). The college is listed as `CHN' in the allocation list of engineering seats maintained by the Commissioner for Entrance Examinations, Government of Kerala

Courses 
Two year postgraduate course in:
M.Tech Electronics Engineering (VLSI and Embedded Systems) - 24 seats (from academic year 2010-11)
M.Tech Computer Science (Digital Image Processing) - 24 seats
MCA Master of Computer Application(from academic year 2022)

Four-year B.Tech. degrees in:
 Computer Science and Engineering - 120 seats (formerly, Computer Engineering)
 Electronics and Communication Engineering - 120 seats (formerly, Electronics Engineering)
 Electrical and Electronics Engineering - 120 seats (from academic year 2009-10)

About 
Admission to the courses is on an annual basis and is based on the All Kerala Common Entrance Examination conducted by the Controller of Entrance Examinations, Government of Kerala. The admissions to the free/merit seats and management seats are through the Central Allotment Process conducted by the Controller of Entrance Examinations, Government of Kerala. The proportion of seats are as follows: free/merit seats 50%, management seats 35% (as aforementioned allotment to both these categories are through the Central Allotment Process ), the remaining 15% seats come under the NRI quota.

Annual intake 
CEC has an annual intake of 420 students (+10% lateral entry students) through government allotment, divided among the four branches as follows:
 Computer Science and Engineering: 120 (+10% lateral entry students)
 Electronics and Communication Engineering: 120(+10% lateral entry students)
 Electrical and Electronics Engineering: 120 (+10% lateral entry students)
 Electronics and Instrumentation Engineering: 60 (+10% lateral entry students)

CEC technical and non-technical events

SUMMIT 
Summit is a biennial technical festival conducted by the college, to providing a platform for improving the technical and non-technical skills of the students. The Summit offers events including seminars and workshops.

Summit'12 was the sixth event of its kind, a three-day festival. Summit '12 differed from its predecessor as it was a techno-cultural event. The last Summit was held in February 2019.

Technical organizations

IEEE Student Branch 
An IEEE student branch was formed in CEC in mid-1997, with the goal of keeping the students in touch with technological advances. An IEEE library was inaugurated in December 1999. The library houses journals and magazines of IEEE. The IEEE student branch comes under the IEEE Kerala Section (http://www.ewh.ieee.org/r10/kerala/)
(http://www.cecieee.org)

CEC's IEEE student members have presented projects at state and national level conferences and competitions. An IEEE Robotics Initiative Program has begun, with groups designing robots. IEEE-CEC is known for its consistent achievements since its inception in 1996. IEEE-CEC is also known for many firsts including being the first IEEE Student Branch in the world to win the IEEE WIE SB Affinity Group of the year award in 2005.

PRODDEC (Product Design and Development Center) 
PRODDEC CEC is a pioneer in technical organizations of CEC since its inception in 1995, with a prime vision to integrate technical ideas to develop products of an engineering outlook. The organization is always in the quest for new avenues to help and encourage the students to put their theoretical knowledge to practical use. In its endeavor the organization is always open to suggestions, constructive criticism, and moral support. In the course of time, PRODDEC has contributed greatly to the overall development of the students as competent engineers.

Proud of the achievements since its formation, PRODDEC members have proved their mark in every area possible right from national competitions to public comfort systems, the automated traffic light system in Chengannur, automated admission procedure implementation in the college being few of them. The forum owns a PRODDEC lab in the college which shelters the creation of budding engineering products and discussions. Moving on with the torch lit and handed over by the eminent alumni, the team aims and works consistently in providing a platform for students of both computer science and electronic branches to exchange ideas and sharpen their technical skills.

PRODDEC has conducted webinars, workshops ranging from introductory to advanced level with hands-on training for students and strives to keep students updated with the latest trends and advancements in technology emerging around the globe.

FOCES (Forum of Computer Engineering Students) 
FOCES is an organization of CSE students of the college. The forum aims at improving the technical and industrial knowledge of the students and strives to keep them abreast with software and technologies evolving in the information technology field. It welcomes the freshers into the world of computer engineering by conducting orientation classes.

After renovating FOCES in January 2010, its code of conduct has changed slightly, and now all students can join the forum, but CSE students are default members. Newsletters and CDs are brought out to keep the students abreast of trends. It organizes talks by personalities in the industry on evolving technologies in computing, workshops on developing platforms, languages and software packages in the IT industry..

Website: - http://www.foces.org

ExESS (Electronics Engineering Students Society) 
The activities of ExESS have helped students in attending state and national level contests. Apart from conducting technical learning sessions for Component familiarisations and Electronic Design Automation (EDA) tools, ExESS also does hands-on training sessions for soldering and PCB fabrication.

FLOSS (Free/Libre/Open-Source Software) Cell 
The FLOSS cell has been organized to explain Open Source and Linux. The cell conducts Linux familiarisation classes, installation sessions and other activities. FLOSS Cell helps install and maintain systems and LAN in the nearby government school.

Innovation and Entrepreneurship Development Cell [IEDC] 
The Innovation and Entrepreneurship Development Cell [IEDC] Bootcamp College of Engineering Chengannur came into existence in June 2015.They aim at promoting entrepreneurial spirit among students.IEDC seeks to inculcate the entrepreneurial culture among the students which would, in turn, inspire them to go a step further and take up the challenge of entrepreneurship.

Non-technical organizations

National Service Scheme 

NSS CEC now consists of 3 units with a maximum volunteer strength of 300, in which each student embraces the idea of everyone belonging to the same family.

Over the years the college has made a benchmark for units across the state due to its commendable coordination and activities conducted. Such activities include the successful hosting of stem cell donation camps, blood donation camps, medical camps, etc., where students were made aware of the topics and have volunteered their assistance. The link between our student volunteers was well demonstrated in the programme 'Sahapadikk Oru Veedu' in which they formed an entente to rebuild home for their fellow colleague who lost his home in 2018 flood.

Another great example of our unity and willingness for service was showcased by the involvement during relief operations of 2018-19 floods. Students with no prior training to handle such situations coordinated despite their drawbacks and successfully helped to transform the college into a relief camp, thus saving hundreds of lives. The activities of the units extend to much more than activities held during a crisis.

Each year volunteers take part in 'Punarjani', the event where they aid community service centers such as hospitals in repairing damaged machinery and extend their assistance in whatever ways possible. The social commitments of our volunteers are evident from the Friday food serving programme at District hospital Chengannur to provide food for those in need. As directed by the Cell the three units conduct campus programmes exploring the talents in youth, awareness sessions brushing up their knowledge and community programmes that improvise their social skills. The units also extend their aid in helping with the internal duties of the college such as active participation during admission procedures and campus cleaning programmes. Our vivid spirit is not only seen in such commitments. The college hosts a plethora of talents whose skills are displayed in a variety of cultural events such as flash mobs, street plays on relevant topics, etc. We successfully hosted the second edition of UYILO, a techno-cultural fest with astounding feedback and plans to conduct further editions of the same in the years to come. The units have shown their active participation in almost every aspect pertaining to social and cultural welfare, and as the years progress it sets on reaching more milestones and prove to be an exemplary model for both its own volunteers and those outside.

Santhwanam 
Integrated with the NSS unit, it undertakes campus cleaning drives, sending volunteers to the Pulse-Polio Immunization programs of the Government of India, and organizes orphanage visits.

Nature Club 
CEC has joined hands with the "Save the Earth" global movement through the `Aranyam' forestry club. Group discussions, awareness camps and visits to nearby sanctuaries are some of the activities.

Arts Club 
ACE (Arts Club for Engineers) provides a platform for students to develop their creative skills. It runs the Music club, Quiz and Debate club, and Audio Visual club. The Arts Club organizes "Utsav", the college arts festival.

The Students' Executive Senate (CEC Senate) 
The Students Executive Senate, simply known as 'CEC Senate', is the supreme student body. The members of the senate are elected by and from the students, with two representatives from each class. The objectives of the senate are: to train the students of the college in their duties, responsibilities, and rights, to organize debates, seminars, group discussions, work squads, and tours, and to encourage sports, arts and other cultural, social or recreational activities.

Training Placement Cell 
The Training and Placement Cell (TPC) is a blend of faculty and students. With a group of students led by a Placement officer (Dr Raju M), the TPC helps the CECians choose their goal, prepare for it and find placements in work. The TPC of Chengannur Engineering College was the first of its kind, among the college placement units in the state, to introduce an 'Industry like' screening system for the selection of TPC student members.

Entrepreneurship 

Present as well as former students of College of Engineering Chengannur, have shown excellent entrepreneurship capabilities. Over 30+  Companies (Registered) have been initiated from this institute.

Some of the noteworthy companies from College of Engineering Chengannur are : 
 ExTravelMoney Technosol  - Online Forex Services Product
 Profoundis Labs - IT Solutions (Acquired by FullContact)
Red Panthers - Software Consultancy firm specializing in Ruby on Rails
 Veeble Softtech - Web Hosting, Web Development Company
 Poornam Infovision - IT Solutions
 Perleybrook Labs LLC - IT Solutions
 Entri.me - Educational Tech Product Startup
 Praudyogiki Technolabs LLP - IT Solutions

Notable alumni
Anagha (actress), Indian film industry

See also
 List of Engineering Colleges in Kerala
 KEAM

References

External links

Official website
CEC Alumni website
FoCES
CECians unofficial blog
SUMMIT '14 National Level Technical Fest website (new)
Cochin University of Science And Technology official website
The Institute of Human Resource Development Kerala official website
FLOSS cell of CEC
The IEEE Student Branch
CEC on Twitter
CECians Google Group (new)

Engineering colleges in Kerala
All India Council for Technical Education
Institute of Human Resources Development
Universities and colleges in Alappuzha district
Educational institutions established in 1993
1993 establishments in Kerala